Colwellia marinimaniae is a hyperpiezophilic bacterium from the genus Colwellia which has been isolated from deep regions of the Mariana Trench. It is, so far, the most piezophilic organism yet described, with an optimal growth pressure of 120 MPa (approximately 1,200 atmospheres).

References

External links
Type strain of Colwellia marinimaniae at BacDive -  the Bacterial Diversity Metadatabase
Bacterium named after GW's Marine Mania (a high school science group, located on the island of Guam)

Alteromonadales
Bacteria described in 2017